Lopshenga is a rural locality (a village) and the administrative center of Pertominskoye Rural Settlement of Primorsky District, Arkhangelsk Oblast, Russia. The population was 215 as of 2010. There are 3 streets.

Geography 
Lopshenga is located 234 km northwest of Arkhangelsk (the district's administrative centre) by road. Yarenga is the nearest rural locality.

References 

Rural localities in Primorsky District, Arkhangelsk Oblast
Arkhangelsky Uyezd
Road-inaccessible communities of Russia